Janice Bell (born in Scotland) is a United States lawn bowls international.

Bowls career

World Championship
Bell competed at the 2016 World Outdoor Bowls Championship in Christchurch and four years later in 2020 was selected for the 2020 World Outdoor Bowls Championship in Australia.

Asia Pacific
Bell won a fours silver medal at the 2015 Asia Pacific Bowls Championships in Christchurch, New Zealand.

Atlantic Championships
In 2011 she won the pairs and fours bronze medals at the Atlantic Bowls Championships.

References

Living people
American female bowls players
Scottish female bowls players
Year of birth missing (living people)
21st-century American women